The 1852 United States presidential election in Maine took place on November 2, 1852, as part of the 1852 United States presidential election. Voters chose eight representatives, or electors to the Electoral College, who voted for President and Vice President.

Maine voted for the Democratic candidate, Franklin Pierce, over the Whig Party candidate, Winfield Scott. Pierce won the state by a margin of 11.03%. 

Pierce would be the last Democratic candidate to win Maine until Woodrow Wilson in 1912 and the last one until Lyndon B. Johnson in 1964 to win a majority of the popular vote. This would be the last occasion until 1880 that a Democrat carried any county in the state, the last until 1964 that a Democratic presidential candidate won Franklin County, Oxford County, Penobscot County or Piscataquis County, and the last until 1912 that a Democrat carried Cumberland County, Hancock County, Washington County or York County.

Results

See also
 United States presidential elections in Maine

References

Maine
1852
1852 Maine elections